The North Worcester Aid Society was a charitable society based in Worcester, Massachusetts. It was founded in 1874 to provide clothing for children orphaned during the American Civil War. It met in a school on Holden Street until 1887, when land nearby was donated to the group, and its building at 58 Holden Street was built.

The society's building as originally built was a relatively simple -story wood-frame structure with minimal Queen Anne/Stick style decoration with a rectangular plan. In 1928 the southern wing and small porch were added, providing the society with dining and social space. This addition was designed by Worcester architect G. Adolph Johnson. The society was at its height in the 1940s, declining afterward. It was dissolved in 1990.

The building was listed on the National Register of Historic Places in 1980. It is now a private residence.

See also
National Register of Historic Places listings in northwestern Worcester, Massachusetts
National Register of Historic Places listings in Worcester County, Massachusetts

References

Clubhouses on the National Register of Historic Places in Massachusetts
Buildings and structures completed in 1887
Buildings and structures in Worcester, Massachusetts
National Register of Historic Places in Worcester, Massachusetts
Charities based in Massachusetts